XO-2 is a binary star. It consists of two components: XO-2S (Also known as XO-2A) and XO-2N (Also known as XO-2B).

This system is located approximately 500 light-years away from Earth in the Lynx constellation.  Both of these stars are slightly cooler than the Sun and are nearly identical to each other. The system has a magnitude of 11 and cannot be seen with the naked eye but is visible through a small telescope. These stars are also notable for their large proper motions.

XO-2N and XO-2S have a separation of approximately  AU.

Planetary systems
There are two known exoplanets orbiting XO-2N. XO-2Nb (or rarely XO-2Bb), which is classified as a hot Jupiter, was discovered by the XO Telescope using the transit method orbiting XO-2N (XO-2B) in 2007 and XO-2Nc was discovered in 2015 using the radial velocity method.

Two planets were reported to orbit around XO-2S in 2014 using radial velocity method. One of them is Jupiter-mass and another has a mass comparable to Saturn.

Both stars also show RV-trends, which may indicate the presence of additional long-periodic jovians or brown dwarfs around each of them.

See also
 HD 20781 and HD 20782
 XO Telescope
 List of extrasolar planets

References

External links
 NASA PlanetQuest: Planet race heats up: 1 month, 32 discoveries
 

K-type main-sequence stars
Lynx (constellation)
Planetary transit variables
Planetary systems with four confirmed planets
2
Binary stars